This page lists all of the characters in the 13th-century Old French Le Roman de Silence by Heldris de Cornuälle. It contains summaries for both major and minor characters as well as an indication of where they are found (for minor characters, especially those without proper names).

Characters

References 
Citations

Bibliography
 Burr, Kristin L. "A Question of Honor: Eufeme's Transgressions in Le Roman de Silence." Medieval Feminist Forum 38.1 (2004): 28-37.
 

Old French texts
Medieval French romances
Lists of fictional characters